Sino-Pack is an exhibition of packaging products held in China annually.

History 
The exhibition was initially held in 1994. It has always been one of the most influential packaging exhibitions in China. In 2008, more than 200 internationally reputable exhibitors from 14 countries and regions participated in the show, which occupied an exhibition area of 11,000 square meters and lead to business prospects for more than 13,000 professional visitors from 54 countries and regions.

Sino-Pack & China Drinktec 2009 

The 16th China  International Exhibition on Packaging Machinery & Materials (Sino-Pack  2009) along with the  13th China  International Exhibition on Beverage, Brewery and Wine Technology (China  Drinktec 2009) was held on    3 – 6 March 2009 in   Guangzhou, People's Republic of China. It occupied   20,000 sq.m. Exhibition area,  and had 500  exhibitors.

The exhibitions were  organized by China  Foreign Trade Centre (Group), Adsale Exhibition Services Ltd, and the relevant eindustry associations.

References

External links
Official Site
drinktec

Packaging
Recurring events established in 1994
Trade fairs in China